The du Temple Monoplane was a steam-powered aircraft made of aluminium, built in Brest, France, by naval officer Félix du Temple in 1874.

It had a wingspan of 13 m (43 ft) and weighed 80 kg (180 lb) without the pilot.

Several trials were made with the aircraft, and it is generally recognized that it achieved lift-off – described by Dollfus as "short hop or leap" and in Flight International as "staggered briefly into the air" – (from a combination of its own power and running down an inclined ramp), glided for a short time and returned safely to the ground, making it the first successful powered flight in history though not the first self-powered one.

It was displayed at the 1878 Exposition Universelle ("World Fair") in Paris.

Steam engine 

The aircraft used a very compact, high-speed circulation steam engine for which Félix du Temple applied for a patent on 28 April 1876. The engine used very small pipes packed together "to obtain the highest possible contact surface for the smallest possible volume" 

 "When he began with the aid of his brother, M. Louis du Temple, to experiment on a large scale, the inadequacy of all motors then known became apparent. They first tried steam at very high pressures, then a hot-air engine, and finally built and patented, in 1876 a very light steam boiler weighing from 39 to 44 lb. to the horse power, which appears to have been the prototype of some of the light boilers which have since been constructed. It consisted in a series of very thin tubes less than 1/8 in. in internal diameter, through which water circulated very rapidly, and was flashed into steam by the surrounding flame."

This type of boiler, which boils the water instantly, has come to be known as a flash boiler. The engine design was later adopted by the French Navy for the propulsion of the first French torpedo boats:

 "Officers and engineers have now made up their opinion regarding Du Temple's steam engine. Everybody proclaims the superiority of its qualities… orders are pouring in from our commercial harbours and from the French government."

See also 

 Early flying machines
 History of aviation
 Timeline of aviation – 19th century

Notes

External links 

 Flying machines
 Pioneers and innovators

19th-century French experimental aircraft
Single-engined tractor aircraft
Steam-powered aircraft
Monoplane
Shoulder-wing aircraft

fi:Höyrylentokone